Smaïn Ibrir (28 March 1932 – 7 July 2021) was an Algerian footballer who played as a defender.

Biography
Born into a sporting family, Ibrir was the son of international goalkeeper Abderrahman Ibrir. He played for the Algerian club JS El Biar from 1953 to 1956 before arriving in France in 1956 to play for Le Havre AC in Division 2. He also played for the national team of the National Liberation Front, the Algerian independence movement during the Algerian War. Following Algeria's independence, he coached small teams in the country before retiring from football activities in 1976.

Smaïn Ibrir died on 7 July 2021 at the age of 89.

References

1932 births
2021 deaths
Algerian footballers
Association football defenders
JS El Biar players
Le Havre AC players
Ligue 2 players
Algerian expatriate footballers
Algerian expatriate sportspeople in France
Expatriate footballers in France
Algerian football managers
People from El Biar
21st-century Algerian people